Abdinur Mohamed Mohamud (born 13 September 1997) is a Somali footballer who plays as a midfielder for Somali First Division club Horseed FC and the Somalia national team.

International career
Mohamud made his international debut with Somalia in November 2011 at the age of 14, however it is unclear whether he made his debut on November 1 against Djibouti, or on November 12 against Ethiopia. Regardless of whichever game he first appeared in, Mohamud is still regarded as the youngest male footballer to appear in a FIFA recognised international fixture, beating Aung Kyaw Tun of Myanmar's 10 year record by between 13 and 25 days.

International statistics

References

External links
 
 
 

1997 births
Living people
Association football midfielders
Somalian footballers
Place of birth missing (living people)
Somalia international footballers
Somalian expatriate footballers
Expatriate footballers in Mozambique